Angizia is an Austrian avant-garde gothic/folk metal band, formed in Austria in 1994 by Michael Haas (also known as Engelke).

Discography

Studio albums
 Die Kemenaten scharlachroter Lichter (Napalm Records, 1997)
 Das Tagebuch der Hanna Anikin (Napalm Records, 1997)
 Das Schachbrett des Trommelbuben Zacharias (Black Rose Productions, 1998)
 39 Jahre für den Leierkastenmann (Napalm Records, 2001)
 Ein Toter fährt gern Ringelspiel (2004)
 kokon. Ein schaurig-schönes Schachtelstück (2011)
 Des Winters finsterer Gesell (2013)

Split albums and collaborations
Heidebilder (split with Amestigon) (1996)

Compilations
With Us or Against Us - Volume 2 (contributed the track Der Kirschgarten oder Memoiren an die Stirn der Kindeszeit) (1997)
Kenotaph (contributed the track Ithzak Kaufmann und das Bindfadencello) (2005)

References

External links 

Angizia at Encyclopaedia Metallum

1994 establishments in Austria
Austrian gothic metal musical groups
Austrian heavy metal musical groups
Avant-garde metal musical groups
Folk metal musical groups
Musical groups established in 1994